Phyllocnistis iodocella is a moth of the family Gracillariidae. It is known from New South Wales, Australia.

The wingspan is about 5 mm. Adults have white wings, with brown markings on each forewings, and a big fringe at the back of each hindwing.

References

Phyllocnistis
Endemic fauna of Australia